The 2000 Southland Conference baseball tournament was held from May 7 to 10, 2000 to determine the champion of the Southland Conference in the sport of college baseball for the 2000 season.  The event pitted the top six finishers from the conference's regular season in a double-elimination tournament held at Warhawk Field, home field of Louisiana–Monroe in Monroe, Louisiana.  Third-seeded  won their second consecutive, and third overall, championship and claimed the automatic bid to the 2000 NCAA Division I baseball tournament.

Seeding and format
The top six finishers from the regular season were seeded one through six.  They played a double-elimination tournament.

Bracket and results

All-Tournament Team
The following players were named to the All-Tournament Team.

Most Valuable Player
Shane Webb was named Tournament Most Valuable Player.  Webb was a shortstop for Louisiana–Monroe.

References

Tournament
Southland Conference Baseball Tournament
Southland Conference baseball tournament
Southland Conference baseball tournament